St. Paraskevi's Church is a church in Balldren, Lezhë County, Albania. It became a Cultural Monument of Albania in 1984.

References

Cultural Monuments of Albania
Buildings and structures in Lezhë
Roman Catholic churches in Albania